Shadows of Suspicion is a 1919 American silent thriller film directed by Edwin Carewe and starring Harold Lockwood, Naomi Childers, and Helen Lindroth. It is based on the 1915 novel The Yellow Dove by George Fort Gibbs, which was later remade as the 1926 film The Great Deception. Lockwood died in the 1918 flu pandemic while filming was ongoing, and a body double was required to complete the film.

Synopsis
After refusing to join the army on the outbreak of World War I, Cyril Hammersley is suspected of being a coward or worse a German spy. In fact he is working for the British secret service to tackle a German spy ring and thwart a plan to blow up London.

Cast
 Harold Lockwood as Cyril Hammersley 
 Naomi Childers as Doris Mathers 
 Helen Lindroth as Lady Betty Heathcote 
 Kenneth Keating as Geoffrey Mathers 
 William Bailey as Captain Walter Byfield 
 Bigelow Cooper as Sir John Rizzio 
 Leslie T. Peacocke as Chief of Scotland Yard

References

Bibliography
 Goble, Alan. The Complete Index to Literary Sources in Film. Walter de Gruyter, 1999.

External links

1919 films
1910s thriller films
1910s English-language films
American silent feature films
American thriller films
American black-and-white films
Films directed by Edwin Carewe
Metro Pictures films
American World War I films
Films set in London
Films set in England
Silent thriller films
1910s American films